Issyk may refer to
 Esik/Issyk town
 Issyk (river), Kazakhstan
 Lake Issyk, Kazakhstan
 Issyk-Kul (Issyk Lake, Warm Lake), Kyrgyzstan